The women's synchronized 10 meter platform was one of eight diving events included in the Diving at the 2004 Summer Olympics program.

The competition was held as an outright final:

Final 16 August — Each pair of divers performed five dives freely chosen from the five diving groups, with two dives limited to a 2.0 degree of difficulty and the others without limitation. Divers could perform different dives during the same dive if both presented the same difficulty degree. The final ranking was determined by the score attained by the pair after all five dives had been performed.

Results

References

Sources

 Diving. Official Report of the XXVIII Olympiad - Results

Women
2004
2004 in women's diving
Women's events at the 2004 Summer Olympics